The Chymical Wedding is a 1989 novel by Lindsay Clarke about the intertwined lives of six people in two different eras.  
Inspired by the life of Mary Anne Atwood, the book includes themes of alchemy, the occult, fate, passion, and obsession. It won the Whitbread Prize for fiction in 1989.

References 

1989 British novels
British magic realism novels
Novels set in Norfolk
Jonathan Cape books